Mayra Fabiola Olvera Reyes (born 22 August 1992) is an Ecuadorian footballer who plays as a midfielder for the Ecuador women's national team. She was part of the Ecuadorian squad for the 2015 FIFA Women's World Cup.

International career
Olvera represented Ecuador at the 2008 South American U-17 Women's Championship.

References

External links
Mayra Olvera at BDFútbol
 
 Profile  at FEF
 

1992 births
Living people
Women's association football midfielders
Ecuadorian women's footballers
People from Los Ríos Province
Ecuador women's international footballers
2015 FIFA Women's World Cup players
Pan American Games competitors for Ecuador
Footballers at the 2015 Pan American Games
L.D.U. Quito Femenino players
Deportivo Pasto footballers
Patriotas Boyacá footballers
CD Lugo players
C.S.D. Independiente del Valle footballers
Segunda Federación (women) players
Sporting de Gijón (women) players
Ecuadorian expatriate footballers
Ecuadorian expatriate sportspeople in Colombia
Expatriate women's footballers in Colombia
Ecuadorian expatriate sportspeople in Spain
Expatriate women's footballers in Spain
21st-century Ecuadorian women